This is a list of the novels in The Baby-Sitters Club, a children's book series created by Ann M. Martin. Titles are followed by either the date of the first printing (month and year) or by the copyright date (just the year). The first 35 novels of the original series were written by Martin, after which some of the books were ghostwritten; 44 of these were written by Peter Lerangis. Other ghostwriters include Suzanne Weyn, Jahnna M. Malcolm, and Ellen Miles.

Original Series
 Kristy's Great Idea  (August 1986) - The Baby-Sitters Club  is formed by four best friends: Kristy Thomas (president), Claudia Kishi (vice president), Mary Anne Spier (secretary), and Stacey McGill (treasurer).
 Claudia and the Phantom Phone Calls (October 1986) - The babysitters receive mysterious phone calls while babysitting young children. Claudia believes the calls are from The Phantom Caller, a sneaky jewel thief.
 The Truth About Stacey (December 1986) -  Stacey has a problem and it's not her diabetes - it's her parents. She solves her problems with her ex-best friend who is a snob, while battling a rival club called The Baby Sitters Agency, which consists of irresponsible babysitters.
 Mary Anne Saves the Day (February 1987) - Mary Anne has never been a leader, but when The Baby-Sitters Club have a huge fight, she's left alone and The Baby-Sitters Club might fall apart unless she does something fast. Will she be able to save The Baby-Sitters Club?
 Dawn and the Impossible Three (May 1987) - Dawn babysits three wild children of a recent divorce: Buddy, Suzi, and Marnie Barrett. Kristy thinks things were better without Dawn, but Dawn aims to prove her wrong.
 Kristy's Big Day (July 1987) - Kristy's mother is getting married! The Baby-Sitters Club babysits for the children of the guests, which causes chaos.
 Claudia and Mean Janine (September 1987) - Claudia has issues with her genius sister Janine, even after her grandmother Mimi has a stroke.
 Boy-Crazy Stacey (November 1987) - Stacey, while spending two weeks at the Jersey shore as one of two helpers to the Pike family, gets a crush on a lifeguard at the beach.
 The Ghost at Dawn's House (January 1988) - Dawn thinks that her new house is haunted, especially after she makes a startling discovery inside the house - and it's not imaginary.
 Logan Likes Mary Anne! (February 1988) - Logan Bruno has just moved to Stoneybrook from Kentucky and met Mary Anne, and he is in love with her. Plus, she likes him back! But Cokie Mason and her friends are fighting for him too.
 Kristy and the Snobs (March 1988) - Kristy moves to a new neighborhood following her mother's marriage, where she is made to feel inferior to the other residents, especially when they make fun of her sick dog.
 Claudia and the New Girl (April 1988) - An artistic new student, Ashley Wyeth, tries to convince Claudia to quit The Baby-Sitters Club.
 Good-bye Stacey, Good-bye (May 1988) - Stacey moves back to New York, and the members of The Baby-Sitters Club find it hard saying goodbye to her as best friends
 Hello, Mallory (June 1988) - Following Stacey's move, The Baby-Sitters Club invites Mallory Pike to join the club, if she passes a series of tests. Upon learning that she failed the tests, Mallory, along with her new friend Jessica "Jessi" Ramsey, decide to start their own babysitting club. Meanwhile, the members of The Baby-Sitters Club are realizing that they are too busy and might not be able to take every babysitting job that they are offered. Could Mallory and her new friend Jessi be the solution to the club's problem?
 Little Miss Stoneybrook ... and Dawn (August 1988) - The Baby-Sitters Club gets involved in a children's beauty contest.
 Jessi's Secret Language (September 1988) - Jessi babysits a deaf boy, and learns sign language, which she uses to help break down barriers.
 Mary Anne's Bad Luck Mystery (October 1988) - Mary Anne gets mysterious letters saying she will have bad luck.
 Stacey's Mistake (November 1988) - Stacey invites Kristy, Mary Anne, Dawn, and Claudia to New York so they can babysit a large group of kids but they don't fit in with her friends. Additionally, her two best friends, Claudia and Laine Cummings, may become rivals.
 Claudia and the Bad Joke (December 1988) - Claudia's leg is broken by a sitting charge who pulls a prank, which causes her to consider quitting The Baby-Sitters Club. Meanwhile, The Baby-Sitters Club becomes involved in a prank war with the joker, Betsy Sobak.
 Kristy and the Walking Disaster (January 1989) - Kristy babysits a "walking disaster" child named Jackie Rodowsky, and starts the softball team Kristy's Krushers. They are challenged by Bart's Bashers, and Kristy might have a crush on the coach, Bart Taylor.
 Mallory and the Trouble with Twins (February 1989) - Mallory babysits troublesome twins and tries to convince her parents to let her get her ears pierced. Meanwhile, the twins are trying to express their individuality, and Mallory realizes that she wants to do the same.
 Jessi Ramsey, Pet-sitter (March 1989) - Jessi Ramsey has to take care of a house full of animals, including troublesome dogs and a snake.
 Dawn on the Coast (April 1989) - Since her parents' divorce, Dawn lives in Connecticut with her mother, while her brother and father are in California.
 Kristy and the Mother's Day Surprise (May 1989) - Kristy and The Baby-Sitters Club plan a huge outing as a Mother's Day surprise for their clients. However, Kristy's mother also has a surprise of her own.
 Mary Anne and the Search for Tigger (June 1989) - Mary Anne's kitten goes missing, and the members of The Baby-Sitters Club are determined to help find him.
 Claudia and the Sad Good-bye (July 1989) - Claudia's family suffers a great loss when her grandmother Mimi dies.
 Jessi and the Superbrat (September 1989) - Jessi babysits a famous TV star, who claims that he's being bothered by "John". Jessi nicknames John "The Superbrat", but is Derek, the TV Star, telling the truth?
 Welcome Back, Stacey! (October 1989) - Stacey's parents divorce and she chooses to live with her mother in Stoneybrook.
 Mallory and the Mystery Diary (November 1989) - Mallory finds an old diary, which contains a mystery that involves an old portrait.
 Mary Anne and the Great Romance (January 1990) - Mary Anne and Dawn become stepsisters after Richard Spier and Sharon Schafer marry.
 Dawn's Wicked Stepsister (February 1990) Dawn and Mary Anne discover that visiting each other as friends and living with each other as family are two different things.
 Kristy and the Secret of Susan (March 1990) - Kristy babysits Susan, who has autism, and learns that Susan will be going to a special school. Kristy hopes she can convince Susan's parents to let her stay in Stoneybrook.
 Claudia and the Great Search (April 1990) - Claudia is unable to find any pictures of her as a baby, which causes her to believe that she may be adopted.
 Mary Anne and Too Many Boys (May 1990) - When Mary Anne and Stacey return to the Jersey shore as mother's helpers for the Pikes, Mary Anne realizes that boys can make her life complicated.
 Stacey and the Mystery of Stoneybrook (June 1990) - The Baby-Sitters Club and Charlotte Johanssen investigate the terrible noises coming from the old Hennessey place, which was built on top of a graveyard.
 Jessi's Baby-sitter (August 1990) - Jessi feels restricted and angry when her aunt moves in and tries to take control of her life.
 Dawn and the Older Boy (September 1990) - The members of The Baby-Sitters Club are determined not to let Dawn get hurt by her boyfriend Travis, who is older and always bossing her around.
 Kristy's Mystery Admirer (October 1990) - Kristy receives mysterious love notes, which soon turn threatening.
 Poor Mallory! (November 1990) - When Mallory's father loses his job, she, along with her siblings, decide to earn money, fearing that they will be poor. Nicky gets a paper route, Vanessa tries selling her poetry, and Mallory babysits for the wealthy Delaneys. However, being around the Delaneys makes her feel poor. Mallory will need her friends more than ever!
 Claudia and the Middle School Mystery (January 1991) - Claudia is accused of cheating on a test, and The Baby-Sitters Club is determined to clear her name.
 Mary Anne vs. Logan (February 1991) - Mary Anne is having trouble with Logan.
 Jessi and the Dance School Phantom (March 1991) - Jessi is thrilled when she earns the lead in her dance school's latest ballet, Sleeping Beauty, until someone starts sabotaging her rehearsals and sending her threatening messages.
 Stacey's Emergency (April 1991) - During a visit to New York, Stacey's diabetes causes her to go to the hospital.
 Dawn and the Big Sleepover (May 1991) - When a group of children learns that fire destroyed their pen pals' school, Dawn organizes a fundraiser and then rewards the contributors with a big sleepover.
 Kristy and The Baby Parade (July 1991) - Problems develop after Kristy decides to enter the biennial Stoneybrook Baby Parade.
 Mary Anne Misses Logan (August 1991) - Mary Anne begins to have second thoughts about ending her relationship with Logan.
 Mallory on Strike (September 1991) - Mallory needs peace and quiet if she's going to win the Young Authors Day Award for Best Overall Fiction in the Sixth Grade, but the only way to get it is to stop babysitting - even for her own brothers and sisters.
 Jessi's Wish (October 1991) - When Jessi volunteers to help supervise the Kids Can Do Anything Club, she meets a nine-year-old named Danielle, who, although very sick with cancer, faces her future with courage and hope.
 Claudia and the Genius of Elm Street (November 1991) - Claudia feels insecure when she babysits a gifted young girl named Rosie Wilder.
 Dawn's Big Date (January 1992) - Dawn tries to give herself a new image by changing her hair, makeup, clothes, and personality to impress her pen pal Lewis. Will Lewis like the new Dawn Schafer?
 Stacey's Ex-Best Friend (February 1992) - Stacey's best friend Laine visits Stoneybrook, and she is rude to everyone there.
 Mary Anne + 2 Many Babies (March 1992) - Mary Anne and Logan have an egg "baby" to look after for a school project, while Mary Anne has to care for real babies too.
 Kristy for President (April 1992) - When Kristy begins to dislike the way things are run at Stoneybrook Middle School, she takes charge by running for class president.
 Mallory and the Dream Horse (May 1992) - Mallory takes riding lessons.
 Jessi's Gold Medal (June 1992) - Jessi takes up synchronized swimming during gym class, and she and her partner compete in a contest.
 Keep Out, Claudia (August 1992) - A racist family does not want Claudia or Jessi to babysit for them.
 Dawn Saves the Planet (September 1992) - Dawn takes action against pollution, but becomes obsessed and risks losing her friends and ruining her reputation.
 Stacey's Choice (October 1992) - Stacey is forced to choose between her parents again when her mother is sick and her father has an important event.
 Mallory Hates Boys (and Gym) (November 1992) - Gym class and boys begin to ruin Mallory's life.
 Mary Anne's Makeover (December 1992) - Mary Anne gets a haircut and a new look, but the members of The Baby-Sitters Club aren't pleased.
 Jessi and the Awful Secret (February 1993) - Jessi meets a dancer and suspects that she has an eating disorder.
 Kristy and the Worst Kid Ever (March 1993) - The Papadakis' new foster child, Lou McNally, is a troublemaker.
 Claudia's Friend  (April 1993) - Claudia babysits Shea Rodowsky and discovers they have similar struggles with their schooling.
 Dawn's Family Feud (May 1993) - Dawn and Mary Anne's new step family encounters major problems.
 Stacey's Big Crush (June 1993) - Stacey develops a crush on her 22-year-old substitute math teacher.
 Maid Mary Anne (August 1993) - Mary Anne agrees to help an elderly woman named Mrs. Towne with her housework in exchange for quilting and sewing lessons. However, Mrs. Towne soon begins to take advantage of Mary Anne's generosity.
 Dawn's Big Move (September 1993) - Dawn decides that seeing her father and brother only on holidays isn't enough, and decides to move back to California for six months.
 Jessi and the Bad Baby-sitter (October 1993) - Jessi asks a new girl to join The Baby-Sitters Club, which turns out to be a mistake.
 Get Well Soon, Mallory! (October 1993) - Mallory has not been feeling well and discovers she has mononucleosis.
 Stacey and the Cheerleaders (December 1993) - Stacey tries out for the cheerleading squad, but when she falls in love with a basketball player, she begins to think her friends are immature.
 Claudia and the Perfect Boy (January 1994) - Claudia starts a personals column in the school newspaper when she becomes desperate for a boyfriend.
 Dawn and the We ♥ Kids Club (February 1994) - In California, the We Love Kids Club experiences fame and tries to handle it.
 Mary Anne and Miss Priss (March 1994) - Jenny Prezzioso is driving Mary Anne crazy with her fussiness, and The Baby-Sitters Club tries to find out why she is behaving this way.
 Kristy and the Copycat (April 1994) - Kristy's stepsister Karen continually copies her.
 Jessi's Horrible Prank (May 1994) - Jessi plays a mean trick on her substitute teacher.
 Stacey's Lie (June 1994) - Stacey lies to her father to be with her boyfriend Robert during her vacation.
 Dawn and Whitney, Friends Forever (August 1994) - Dawn makes a new friend when she babysits Whitney, who is a 12-year-old girl with Down syndrome. However, Whitney doesn't know that Dawn is babysitting her. What will happen if she finds out?
 Claudia and Crazy Peaches (September 1994) - Claudia has trouble with her pregnant aunt.
 Mary Anne Breaks the Rules (October 1994) - Mary Anne has Logan over during a sitting job and gets caught.
 Mallory Pike, #1 Fan (November 1994) - Mallory discovers that her favorite author lives in Stoneybrook.
 Kristy and Mr. Mom (January 1995) - Kristy's stepfather has a heart attack and becomes a stay-at-home dad.
 Jessi and the Troublemaker (February 1995) - Danielle might be sick, but it is not obvious from her actions.
 Stacey vs. the BSC (March 1995) - Stacey isn't getting along with the members of The Baby-Sitters Club.
 Dawn and the School Spirit War (April 1995) - Problems start during School Spirit Week and Mary Anne begins to fear going to school.
 Claudia Kishi, Live from WSTO! (May 1995) - Claudia works for a radio station, and must deal with her assistant, Ashley Wyeth.
 Mary Anne and Camp BSC (June 1995) - The Baby-Sitters Club runs a summer camp for children, but when Mary Anne's father goes away on a business trip, she becomes depressed.
 Stacey and the Bad Girls (July 1995) - Stacey's new friends are not responsible and get her in trouble.
 Farewell, Dawn (August 1995) - Dawn decides to move back to California permanently and has a huge argument with Mary Anne.
 Kristy and the Dirty Diapers (September 1995) - Davis Diapers starts sponsoring Kristy's Krushers, ruining the way the Krushers play ball.
 Welcome to the BSC, Abby (October 1995) - Abby Stevenson decides to join The Baby-Sitters Club, but when Kristy starts doubting her after an asthma scare, Abby tries to prove that she should be a member.
 Claudia and the First Thanksgiving (November 1995) - Claudia's drama class writes a Thanksgiving play for the children at Stoneybrook Elementary, but some parents and teachers say it's un-American and protest.
 Mallory's Christmas Wish (December 1995) - Mallory's family experiences fame when her little sister, Vanessa, enters and wins a contest for their family's old fashioned Christmas.
 Mary Anne and the Memory Garden (January 1996) - Amelia, Mary Anne's friend and English project partner, dies in a car accident, leaving Mary Anne feeling helpless.
 Stacey McGill, Super Sitter (February 1996) - Stacey is taken advantage of by a new client, who makes her do extra work.
 Kristy + Bart = ? (March 1996) - When Bart appears to like Kristy as more than friends, she must figure out if she likes him back.
 Abby's Lucky Thirteen (April 1996) - Abby must deal with being accused of cheating on a math test while she and her sister prepare for their Bat mitzvah.
 Claudia and the World's Cutest Baby (May 1996) - Claudia is delighted when her Aunt Peaches has a baby girl, and volunteers to help with the baby; however, she soon becomes a nuisance when she starts offering child care advice.
 Dawn and Too Many Sitters (June 1996) - Dawn is back in Stoneybrook for the summer, and The Baby-Sitters Club struggle to make money once they take on the Pike triplets and Dawn's younger brother as babysitters in training.
 Stacey's Broken Heart (August 1996) - Stacey fears it's the end of her relationship with Robert as she prepares to visit New York City for a week.
 Kristy's Worst Idea (September 1996) - The Baby-Sitters Club appears to be falling apart and things only get worse when a babysitting charge is hurt while Kristy is babysitting. Is this the end of the Baby-Sitters Club?
 Claudia Kishi, Middle School Dropout (October 1996) - Claudia is sent back to the seventh grade, where she doesn't know anyone.
 Mary Anne and the Little Princess (November 1996) - A princess is moving to Stoneybrook for six months and Mary Anne is hired to introduce her to the American way of life.
 Happy Holidays, Jessi (December 1996) - Jessi's brother is hurt in a car accident.
 Abby's Twin (January 1997) - Abby and Anna might be twins, but that doesn't make them the same. When Anna faces bad news about her health, Abby is at a loss for how to help her sister.
 Stacey the Math Whiz (February 1997) - Stacey has doubts when she is asked to join the Stoneybrook Middle School Mathletes.
 Claudia, Queen of The Seventh Grade (March 1997) - Claudia is elected Queen of the Seventh Grade.
 Mind Your Own Business, Kristy! (April 1997) - Kristy is horrified by Charlie's new girlfriend.
 Don't Give Up, Mallory (May 1997) - Mallory's dream class turns into a disappointment when her teacher favors the boys.
 Mary Anne to the Rescue (June 1997) - Mary Anne's life becomes hectic when The Baby-Sitters Club members participate in a first aid class and Logan's parents decide to send him to boarding school.
 Abby the Bad Sport (August 1997) - Abby clashes with her soccer teammate.
 Stacey's Secret Friend (September 1997) - Stacey takes on the task of helping Tess Swinhart with a fashion makeover, but is Stacey the one that's wrong about Tessa's style?
 Kristy and the Sister War (October 1997) - Kristy tries to smooth out tension in Shannon Kilbourne's house.
 Claudia Makes Up Her Mind (November 1997) - Claudia must decide between two boys and if she wants to go back to eighth grade.
 The Secret Life of Mary Anne Spier (December 1997) - Mary Anne takes a second job at the mall, which she doesn't want anyone to find out about.
 Jessi's Big Break (January 1998) - Jessi gets accepted at a dance school in New York City.
 Abby and the Best Kid Ever (February 1998) - The Papadakis' foster child Lou McNally is back and is acting a little too perfect.
 Claudia and the Terrible Truth (March 1998) - Claudia is worried that her new babysitting charges are being abused.
 Kristy Thomas, Dog Trainer (April 1998) - Kristy and her family get a puppy that is being trained to be a guide dog.
 Stacey's Ex-Boyfriend (May 1998) - Stacey's ex-boyfriend is feeling down and the only thing that can cheer him up is her.
 Mary Anne and the Playground Fight (June 1998) - The babysitters compete for six job openings at a new playground camp.
 Abby in Wonderland (August 1998) - Abby worries that there's something wrong with her grandmother.
 Kristy in Charge (September 1998) - Kristy is involved in a feud with Cary Retlin when they are assigned to teach gym together.
 Claudia's Big Party (October 1998) - Claudia hosts a party between her old and new friends when her parents are out of town.
 Stacey McGill…Matchmaker (November 1998) - Stacey plays matchmaker between her mother and the father of her new sitting charges.
 Mary Anne in the Middle (December 1998) - Mary Anne gets in the middle of a feud between Jessi and Mallory.
 The All-New Mallory Pike (January 1999) - Mallory leaves Stoneybrook, Connecticut in order to attend a boarding school.
 Abby's Un-Valentine (February 1999) - Abby only likes two things about Valentine's Day, and romance isn't one.
 Claudia and the Little Liar (March 1999) - Haley Braddock starts lying about The Baby-Sitters Club, trying to turn the other kids against them.
 Kristy at Bat (April 1999) - Kristy gets demoted to second string on her school's softball team.
 Stacey's Movie (May 1999) - As part of a film course Stacey is doing, she decides to make a documentary about life in Stoneybrook. The film creates conflict between Stacey and her friends when she pursues a tell-all interview.
 The Fire at Mary Anne's House (May 1999) - When Mary Anne's house is destroyed by a fire, her family considers leaving Stonebrook.

Super Specials
1. Baby-sitters on Board! (July 1988) - The babysitters fly to Florida to cruise the Bahamas and visit Disney World.

2. Baby-sitters' Summer Vacation (July 1989) - The babysitters spend the summer as counselors-in-training at Camp Mohawk.

3. Baby-sitters' Winter Vacation (December 1989) - The yearly Stoneybrook Middle School trip to Vermont is happening, and this time all the babysitters are going, although they might get snowed in at Leicester lodge.

4. Baby-sitters' Island Adventure (July 1990) - Claudia, Dawn, and four kids are marooned on an island after a storm blows up during a sailing race.

5. California Girls! (December 1990) - When the babysitters win the lottery, their destination is California, where Mallory changes her appearance, Jessi lands a small part in a television show, and Stacey becomes a surfer girl.

6. New York, New York! (June 1991) - The babysitters visit New York City for two weeks, and all the babysitters find exciting adventures: Is Mallory better than Claudia in art? Who is following Stacey, Mary Anne, and their charges?

7. Snowbound (December 1991) - Twenty-one inches of snow fall in Stoneybrook, stranding the babysitters.

8. Baby-sitters at Shadow Lake (July 1992) - The babysitters go on vacation at Shadow Lake, where they find a mysterious island.

9. Starring the Baby-sitters Club! (December 1992) - The play Peter Pan opens at Stoneybrook Middle School, starring the babysitters and some of their sitting charges, but various problems begin to emerge.

10. Sea City, Here We Come! (July 1993) - The babysitters go to Sea City with the Pikes to serve as mother's helpers. Will they find summer love?

11. The Baby-sitters Remember (July 1994) - A series of recollections. The babysitters share their most vivid memories, such as Dawn's parents' divorce, Stacey's diagnosis of diabetes, and Kristy's first sitting job.

12. Here Come the Bridesmaids! (December 1994) - Dawn's father is getting married in California, and a client of The Baby-Sitters Club is getting married in Stoneybrook on the same day.

13. Aloha, Baby-sitters! (July 1996) - When Mallory is unable to accompany The Baby-Sitters Club on a trip to Hawaii, her friends decide to bring the islands home to her by taking photos and notes of everything they experience.

14. BSC in the USA (July 1997) - Two RVs and two routes for a trip across the United States for all of the babysitters.

15. Baby-sitters' European Vacation (July 1998) - The babysitters visit London and Paris, and Kristy meets Michel, whom she despises - or does she? Meanwhile, Stacey's suitcase is switched with someone else's.

The Baby-Sitters Club: Mysteries
1. Stacey and the Missing Ring (August 1991) - Stacey is accused of stealing a ring while babysitting.

2. Beware, Dawn! (November 1991) - Dawn receives threatening notes and phone calls as she's babysitting, while competing for Sitter of the Month.

3. Mallory and the Ghost Cat (February 1992) - When Mallory babysits for the Craines they discover a cat in the attic while investigating some eerie sounds. They think the mystery is solved until they continue to hear the sounds while the cat is sitting right next to them. Who (or what) is in the attic?

4. Kristy and the Missing Child (May 1992) - Jake Kuhn is reported missing, and Kristy was the last person to see him.

5. Mary Anne and the Secret in the Attic (August 1992) - Mary Anne finds out the truth about her past.

6. The Mystery at Claudia's House (November 1992) - Weird things are happening to the Kishi family when Claudia's room is ransacked and her sister is caught lying to their parents.

7. Dawn and the Disappearing Dogs (February 1993) - Dawn's pet sitting charge and Kristy's puppy go missing, and the babysitters know it's more than a coincidence.

8. Jessi and the Jewel Thieves (April 1993) - Jessi visits her friend Quint in New York City and when they overhear two men discussing a jewel heist, they decide to investigate.

9. Kristy and the Haunted Mansion (June 1993)- Kristy and her softball team get caught in a storm and spend a night in a haunted mansion.

10. Stacey and the Mystery Money (August 1993) - There's counterfeiting going on in Stoneybrook and, when Stacey ends up accidentally paying someone fake money, The Baby-Sitters Club have to clear her name.

11. Claudia and the Mystery at the Museum (November 1993) - Claudia is visiting Stoneybrook's new museum when several thefts occur. Claudia decides to find the culprit and save the museum.

12. Dawn and the Surfer Ghost (December 1993) - Strange things are happening when Dawn sees a ghost off the California coast.

13. Mary Anne and the Library Mystery (February 1994) - Mary Anne gets a job helping with the children's readathon at Stoneybrook Library; however, someone is setting books on fire. Mary Anne, along with the members of The Baby-Sitters Club, decide to find out who the culprit is.

14. Stacey and the Mystery at the Mall (April 1994) - The babysitters are working at the Washington Mall for a class, and they begin to wonder if it's safe to shop there after a series of thefts happen.

15. Kristy and the Vampires (June 1994) - Accidents, mysterious letters, and rivalries on the set of a television film being shot in Stoneybrook add up to trouble for Kristy.

16. Claudia and the Clue in the Photograph (August 1994) - Claudia unknowingly takes pictures of a bank robbery in progress that end up being the only clues to catch the crooks.

17. Dawn and the Halloween Mystery (October 1994) - Trick-or-treating is called off after a robbery in Dawn's neighborhood, unless the We Love Kids Club can catch the robber.

18. Stacey and the Mystery at the Empty House (December 1994) - Stacey is house sitting while the Johanssens are away, only to begin suspecting that she is not alone.

19. Kristy and the Missing Fortune (February 1995) - Kristy digs into Stoneybrook's past and discovers the story of a young heiress who disappeared and took her fortune with her.

20. Mary Anne and the Zoo Mystery (April 1995) - A school trip takes Mary Anne to the zoo and a mystery arises when they discover someone has been letting animals out of their cages.

21. Claudia and the Recipe for Danger (August 1995) - Claudia and Mary Anne enter a baking contest, but someone doesn't want them to win.

22. Stacey and the Haunted Masquerade (October 1995) - Strange things are happening at Stoneybrook Middle School as Stacey helps plan a Halloween dance.

23. Abby and the Secret Society (February 1996) Abby attempts to solve a murder that is tied to the shady past of the old country club, where she gets a part-time job.

24. Mary Anne and the Silent Witness (April 1996) Mary Anne discovers that her babysitting charge has witnessed a vandalism and a fire, but is too scared to tell anyone what he saw.

25. Kristy and the Middle School Vandal (June 1996) Kristy attempts to discover who vandalized the school, while The Baby-Sitters Club tries to win a mystery war.

26. Dawn Schafer, Undercover Baby-sitter (October 1996) Dawn babysits for a family feuding over an inheritance and attempts to bring the family together by helping them solve the mystery.

27. Claudia and the Lighthouse Ghost (December 1996) - Old friends of the Kishi family come to stay and Claudia hears a terrible story that happened a long time ago at the old Stoneybrook lighthouse.

28. Abby and the Mystery Baby (February 1997) - Abby's family takes in a baby left on their porch while the authorities look for the parents.

29. Stacey and the Fashion Victim (April 1997) - Accidents and threatening notes plague Bellair's Fashion Week and Stacey must figure out who is behind it.

30. Kristy and the Mystery Train (June 1997) - Three babysitters embark on a mystery tour with child star Derek Masters, but someone is determined to ruin their good time.

31. Mary Anne and the Music Box Secret (August 1997) - Mary Anne finds a package hidden in the basement of her grandparents' house. Ignoring the curse written on the packaging, she opens it to discover a beautiful music box, just before odd things start happening.

32. Claudia and the Mystery in the Painting (October 1997) - After being told that her friend's grandmother burned all of her own famous paintings before she died, Claudia is suspicious and sets out to find the real truth.

33. Stacey and the Stolen Hearts (February 1998) - Someone steals a bag of valentine grams and begins revealing the personal content on them.

34. Mary Anne and the Haunted Bookstore (April 1998) - Mary Anne gets a job at a bookstore, only to discover occurrences aren't just fiction.

35. Abby and the Notorious Neighbor (June 1998) - Abby becomes convinced that her neighbor is a thief, and tries to gather evidence to take to the police.

36. Kristy and the Cat Burglar (August 1998) - When a cat burglar strikes a Stoneybrook mansion, Kristy and her friends must work to solve the crime before the thief gets away.

Super Mysteries
1. Baby-sitters' Haunted House (June 1995) - Kristy, Claudia, Mary Anne, and Dawn take a trip to Maine to babysit, but wind up with a ghost instead.

2. Baby-sitters Beware (December 1995) - A rock is thrown through Kristy's window, Stacey is almost run down by a car, and a fire is set at Claudia's house. Are The Baby-Sitters Club members being stalked? They hope things will change when Kristy, Stacey, Claudia, and Abby go with Kristy's family on vacation at Shadow Lake, but the accidents get scarier.

3. Baby-sitters' Fright Night (October 1996) - Kristy, Mary Anne, Stacey, Abby, and Mallory take a school trip to Salem, Massachusetts, and discover a mystery in addition to their history lessons.

4. Baby-sitters' Christmas Chiller (December 1997) - The Christmas season takes on a spooky feeling when the members of The Baby-Sitters Club become tangled up in a string of mysterious events.

Special Edition Readers’ Requests
1. Logan’s Story (June 1992) - Logan Bruno is teased by the members of his football team when they find out that he is a member of The Baby-Sitters Club.

2. Logan Bruno, Boy Baby-sitter (July 1993) - Logan gets in trouble when he starts hanging out with T-Jam, a member of Stoneybrook Middle School's resident gang.

3. Shannon’s Story (September 1994) - Shannon Kilbourne is usually a good girl, but when her mother announces she's chaperoning Shannon's school trip to Paris, that might change.

Portrait Collections
1. Stacey's Book (November 1994)

2. Claudia's Book (March 1995)

3. Dawn's Book (September 1995)

4. Mary Anne's Book (March 1996)

5. Kristy's Book (September 1996)

6. Abby's Book (March 1998)

The Baby-Sitters Club: Friends Forever
1. Kristy's Big News (August 1999) – Kristy is asked to be a bridesmaid at her father's wedding.

2. Stacey vs. Claudia (September 1999) – When Jeremy Rudolph comes to Stoneybrook from Olympia, Washington, Stacey is sure that he's perfect for her best friend Claudia. However, when it becomes obvious that Jeremy is interested in Stacey, she must choose between Claudia and Jeremy.

3. Mary Anne's Big Breakup (October 1999) – Mary Anne decides to breakup with Logan due to their growing incompatible interests and values. She wants to be Mary Anne again instead of "Mary Anne and Logan".

4. Claudia and the Friendship Feud (November 1999) – Claudia and Stacey still aren't speaking to each other because of their fight over Jeremy, and Claudia finds a new friend named Erica Blumberg.

5. Kristy Power (December 1999) – Kristy and Cary Reitlin are paired together to write biographies about each other, and Kristy discovers that Cary has a secret.

6. Stacey and the Boyfriend Trap (January 2000) - Five of Stacey's ex-boyfriends come into the picture at once.

7. Claudia Gets Her Guy (February 2000) - Claudia has both a chance to date Jeremy and a chance to mend her friendship with Stacey as well.

8. Mary Anne's Revenge (March 2000) - Cokie spreads rumors about Mary Anne and Logan, and Mary Anne exposes Cokie for the brat that she is.

9. Kristy and the Kidnapper (April 2000) - Kristy and Abby go to Washington, D.C. for a debate competition and save David, one of Stacey's ex-boyfriends, from a kidnapper. Will the kidnapper steal David or will he get caught?

10. Stacey's Problem (June 2000) - Stacey is excited that her dad is getting remarried, but her mom is miserable about the news.

11. Welcome Home, Mary Anne (August 2000) - Mary Anne's new house is finally complete, but is she ready for it?

12. Claudia and the Disaster Date (October 2000) - Claudia starts dating class clown, Alan Gray, and begins to see a different side of him.
 Super Special 1: Everything Changes (July 1999) - Some members are leaving The Baby-Sitters Club (Abby, Jessi, Shannon, and Logan), others are looking for a new beginning, and the only thing that's certain is that things are changing.
 Super Special 2: Graduation Day (November 2000) - Kristy, Claudia, Mary Anne, Stacey, Abby, and Logan graduate from Stoneybrook Middle School.

 Graphic novels 

 Kristy's Great Idea adapted by Raina Telgemeier B&W (2006) Color (2015) The Truth About Stacey adapted by Raina Telgemeier B&W (2006) Color (2015) Mary Anne Saves the Day adapted by Raina Telgemeier B&W (2007) Color (2015) Claudia and Mean Janine adapted by Raina Telgemeier B&W (2008) Color (2016) Dawn and the Impossible Three adapted by Gale Galligan (2017) Kristy's Big Day adapted by Gale Galligan (2018) Boy-Crazy Stacey adapted by Gale Galligan (2019) Logan Likes Mary Anne! adapted by Gale Galligan (2020) Claudia and the New Girl adapted by Gabriela Epstein (2021) Kristy and the Snobs adapted by Chan Chau (2021) Good-bye Stacey, Good-bye adapted by Gabriela Epstein (2022) Jessi's Secret Language adapted by Chan Chau (2022) Mary Anne's Bad Luck Mystery adapted by Cynthia Yuan Cheng (2022) Stacey's Mistake adapted by Ellen T. Crenshaw (2023)Other titles
 Postcard Book (April 1991) - A collection of thirty full-color postcards from various covers of the series.
 Notebook - A collection of babysitting tips.
 Ann M. Martin Biography (April 1993) Baby-Sitters Guide to Baby-Sitting (November 1993) Secret Santa - The members of the Baby-Sitters Club play Secret Santa and exchange cards, letters, and grant each other's wishes.
 Chain Letter - The Baby-Sitters Club pass around a chain letter with each other while on vacation, when Kristy's in the hospital with appendicitis. The book features a collection of removable postcards, trinkets, and notes.
 Trivia and Puzzle Fun Book- Word searches, crosswords, and trivia related to the series.
 The Complete Guide to The Baby-Sitters Club (September 1996) - A reference book that includes listings for club facts, Baby-Sitters Club members, Baby-Sitters Club family members, Baby-Sitters Club clients, place, things, and Beyond Stoneybrook.
 Baby-Sitters Little Sister - 122 novels.
 The Summer Before (May 2010)' - A prequel to Kristy's Great Idea''.

References

Novels
Baby-sitters Club novels
Lists of children's books